Rockville is a town in Adams Township, Parke County, in the U.S. state of Indiana. The population was 2,607 at the 2010 census. The town is the county seat of Parke County. It is known as "The Covered Bridge Capital of the World".

History
Rockville was laid out in 1824, three years after the county was founded, and became the county seat. In 1825, its population was between 500 and 600. The residents voted to incorporate the town in July 1854.

The Rockville Chautauqua Pavilion and Rockville Historic District are listed on the National Register of Historic Places.

An earthquake measuring 3.8 on the moment magnitude scale was recorded in the city and confirmed by the USGS on June 17, 2021, with numerous aftershocks reported in cities around the state and Illinois

Geography

Climate
The climate in this area is characterized by hot, humid summers and generally mild to cool winters. According to the Köppen Climate Classification system, Rockville has a humid subtropical climate, abbreviated "Cfa" on climate maps.

Demographics

2010 census
As of the census of 2010, there were 2,607 people, 1,212 households, and 679 families living in the town. The racial makeup of the town was 98.7% White, 0.1% African American, 0.5% Native American, 0.2% Asian, 0.1% from other races, and 0.5% from two or more races. Hispanic or Latino of any race were 0.7% of the population.

There were 1,212 households, of which 24.6% had children under the age of 18 living with them, 39.9% were married couples living together, 12.8% had a female householder with no husband present, 3.3% had a male householder with no wife present, and 44.0% were non-families. 39.5% of all households were made up of individuals, and 20.1% had someone living alone who was 65 years of age or older. The average household size was 2.14 and the average family size was 2.82.

The median age in the town was 44.8 years. 20.9% of residents were under the age of 18; 8.1% were between the ages of 18 and 24; 21.2% were from 25 to 44; 27.4% were from 45 to 64; and 22.3% were 65 years of age or older. The gender makeup of the town was 46.8% male and 53.2% female.

2000 census
As of the census of 2000, there were 2,765 people, 1,286 households, and 735 families living in the town. The racial makeup of the town was 98.16% White, 0.14% African American, 0.47% Native American, 0.29% Asian, 0.22% from other races, and 0.72% from two or more races. Hispanic or Latino of any race were 0.83% of the population.

There were 1,286 households, out of which 24.4% had children under the age of 18 living with them, 43.5% were married couples living together, 10.8% had a female householder with no husband present, and 42.8% were non-families. 39.4% of all households were made up of individuals, and 23.0% had someone living alone who was 65 years of age or older. The average household size was 2.11 and the average family size was 2.82.

In the town, the population was spread out, with 21.5% under the age of 18, 6.9% from 18 to 24, 27.0% from 25 to 44, 20.9% from 45 to 64, and 23.7% who were 65 years of age or older. The median age was 42 years. For every 100 females, there were 81.1 males. For every 100 females age 18 and over, there were 77.0 males.

The median income for a household in the town was $27,813, and the median income for a family was $36,066. Males had a median income of $30,909 versus $21,745 for females. The per capita income for the town was $18,431. About 14.8% of families and 15.4% of the population were below the poverty line, including 28.0% of those under age 18 and 9.7% of those age 65 or over.

Education
The town has a lending library, the Rockville Public Library.

Arts and culture
Rockville hosts the Parke County Covered Bridge Festival.

Notable people
Mark L. De Motte - A Representative in the Forty-seventh US Congress.
Morris K. Jessup - UFO conspiracy theorist.
Don Lash - Champion long-distance runner, settled in Rockville after retiring from a career in the Federal Bureau of Investigation.
Joseph A. Wright - Former Governor of Indiana
J. Howard Moore - Zoologist, philosopher, educator and socialist

References

Bibliography
 

Towns in Parke County, Indiana
Towns in Indiana
County seats in Indiana
Populated places established in 1824
1824 establishments in Indiana